Aspiolucius esocinus or the pike asp is a species of cyprinid fish native to rivers, such as Amu Darya and Syr Darya, and occasionally lakes in Tajikistan, Kyrgyzstan, Turkmenistan, and Uzbekistan, where it was a common fish until 1980s. After that, the population had rapidly declined, so that the species was declared endangered in these countries, and extinct in the neighboring Kazakhstan.

References

Cyprinid fish of Asia
Fish of Central Asia
Fauna of Tajikistan
Fish described in 1874
Taxa named by Karl Kessler
Taxonomy articles created by Polbot

Endangered fish